Sikandarabad  is a village located in the Nagar District of Gilgit–Baltistan in Pakistan. It is the headquarters of "Nagar 2" tehsil. "Sikandarabad" is located on "Karakoram Highway(KKH)".

"Sikandarabad" is a mountainous area. It is along the "Karakoram range". It is near base camp of "Rakaposhi" mountain. Opposite "Skandarabad" there are the great "Himalaya range"mountains. It contains many fruit trees and also vegetables, for example, cherry, apples, peach, apricot, potatoes, and maize. It also has dry fruits trees, for example, walnut, almond, and dry apricot.

Populated places in Nagar District